Llamil Reston (20 May 1926 – 27 December 2019) was an Argentinian military general, who during the National Reorganization Process served as Minister of Labour designated by Jorge Rafael Videla between January 1976 to March 1981, and Minister of Interior designated by Reynaldo Bignone between July 1981 and December 1983. 

He was born in Santiago del Estero city, into a family of Syrian-Lebanese origins. He graduated as Army officer from the Colegio Militar de la Nación in 1944.

He was accused of crimes against humanity, but never convicted. He died in Buenos Aires at the age of 93 years.

References 

1926 births
2019 deaths
Colegio Militar de la Nación alumni
Argentine people of Syrian descent
Ministers of Internal Affairs of Argentina
People from Santiago del Estero
Ministers of labor of Argentina
Argentine generals
Argentine people of Lebanese descent